Ohatchee (inc. 1956) is a town in Calhoun County, Alabama, United States. At the 2020 census, the population was 1,157. It is included in the Anniston–Oxford, Alabama Metropolitan Statistical Area.

History
Andrew Jackson used the area around present-day Ohatchee to prepare for the Battle of Talladega. It was at this battle that Jackson found an Indian boy next to the body of his mother. Jackson adopted the child, naming him Lyncoya Jackson. Lyncoya died of tuberculosis in 1828 at the age of sixteen. The site of the battle is marked with a large stone marker along Alabama Highway 144 between Alexandria and Ohatchee, near Tallaseehatchee Creek.

Between 1863 and 1864, Alfred A. Janney built a furnace, now named Janney Furnace, to produce pig iron for the Confederate States of America during the Civil War. The furnace never went into production, but locals often speak of the quality of the construction because the structure was supposedly built by slaves. The site is now a part of the Calhoun County Park System and features a Civil War memorial alongside a Civil War and Native American museum. The site hosts a town festival every year that includes vendors, children's activities, music, and a Civil War reenactment.

Ohatchee became an incorporated town in 1956. On March 25, 2021, an EF3 tornado struck the town, killing six residents.

Geography
Ohatchee is located in western Calhoun County at 33°48'10.944" North, 86°2'11.864" West (33.803040, -86.036629). The town center lies just north of the confluence of Tallaseehatchee Creek with Ohatchee Creek, a tributary of the Coosa River. A northwest extension of the town limits reaches to the shores of the Coosa River along Neely Henry Lake.

Demographics

2020 census

As of the 2020 United States census, there were 1,157 people, 555 households, and 424 families residing in the town.

2010 census
As of the census of 2010, there were 1,170 people, 474 households, and 361 families residing in the town. The racial makeup of the town was 94.1% White, 3.2% Black or African American, 0.6% Native American, 0.0% Asian, and 2.1% from two or more races. 0.6% of the population were Hispanic or Latino of any race.

There were 474 households, out of which 25.5% had children under the age of 18 living with them, 61.8% were married couples living together, 9.9% had a female householder with no husband present, and 23.8% were non-families. 22.2% of all households were made up of individuals, and 8.3% had someone living alone who was 65 years of age or older. The average household size was 2.47 and the average family size was 2.84.

In the town, the age distribution of the population shows 21.1% under the age of 18, 7.1% from 18 to 24, 22.6% from 25 to 44, 35.0% from 45 to 64, and 14.1% who were 65 years of age or older. The median age was 44.4 years. For every 100 females, there were 105.3 males. For every 100 females age 18 and over, there were 99.0 males.

The median income for a household in the town was $55,769, and the median income for a family was $62,266. Males had a median income of $50,817 versus $26,563 for females. The per capita income for the town was $23,041. About 3.4% of families and 4.6% of the population were below the poverty line, including 1.6% of those under age 18 and 8.1% of those age 65 or over.

Notable people
Clyde Propst, American football coach
Robert Bruce Propst, United States federal judge
Rush Propst, Associate head football coach, Athletic Director at Coosa Christian High School in Gadsden, Alabama. Former head coach of football at Colquitt County High School in Moultrie, Georgia, and former head coach at Hoover High School in Hoover, Alabama.

References 

Towns in Alabama
Towns in Calhoun County, Alabama
Populated places established in 1956
Alabama placenames of Native American origin